Richard Wigglesworth may refer to:

Richard Wigglesworth (rugby union) (born 1983), English rugby union player
Richard B. Wigglesworth (1891–1960), American politician and diplomat